This article refers to telecommunications in Slovenia.

Telephone
Telephones – number of subscribers:
200.266 analog subscribers, 517.284 VoIP subscribers (2016)

Telephones – mobile cellular:
2.341.000 users, 1.784.266 paid subscriptions and 556.223 users of prepaid phones (2016), 100.5% mobile penetration (as of 2016)

Telephone system:
general assessment: well-developed telecommunications infrastructure
domestic: combined fixed-line and mobile-cellular teledensity, roughly 150 telephones per 100 persons
international: country code – 386

Radio
Radio broadcast stations:
AM 5, FM 53 (2016)

Radios:
805,000 (1997)

Television
Television broadcast stations:
20 (2014)

Televisions:
710,000 (1997)

Internet
Internet:
56% Internet penetration, 130.000 ADSL subscribers (November 2005), 2000 ADSL TV subscribers (May 2004), 12.000 VDSL subscribers (July 2006), 3.950 VDSL TV subscribers (July 2006) – currently higher penetration (over 55%) – MOSS 2006 http://www.soz.si/projekti_soz/moss_merjenje_obiskanosti_spletnih_strani/

Internet service providers (ISPs):
SISPA (Slovene Internet Service Provider Association) has 22 members (2004)

Internet hosts:
417,984 (2010)

Internet users:''
1.298 million (2009)Country code (Top level domain): SIInternational radio callsign prefix:''' S5